Strange Cargo is the third studio album by American progressive electronic composer and percussionist David Van Tieghem, released in 1989 by Private Music.

Strange Cargo's music has been described as more diverse by mixing funk, jazz, Asian music and progressive electronic styles, producing structured melodies and weird sounds, with numerous background effects.

Track listing
All music composed by David Van Tieghem except where noted.

 "Strange Cargo" – 5:06     
 "Volcano Diving" (Dave Lebolt, Van Tieghem) – 4:34     
 "Hell or High Water" (Dave Lebolt, Van Tieghem) – 5:22     
 "Eye of the Beholder" – 2:16     
 "Flying Hearts" – 4:02     
 "They Drive by Night" – 8:14      
 "The Ghost Writer Theme" – 1:39     
 "Particle Ballet" – 6:00    
 "Yesterday Island" – 5:15     
 "Carnival of Souls" – 6:28    
 "She's Gone" – 1:40

Personnel
 David Van Tieghem – vocals, multi-instruments, producer, engineer, mixing
 Roma Baran – arranger, producer
 Mark Egan – bass
 Eric Feinstein – finger snaps
 Scott Johnson – electric guitar
 François Kevorkian – producer, mixing
 Dave Lebolt – synthesizer, arranger, keyboards, producer, engineer
 Eric Liljestrand – electric guitar, engineer, finger snaps
 Kate McGarrigle – synthesizer
 Lenny Pickett – clarinet, bass clarinet, piccolo, alto and soprano saxophone
 Paul Rice – piano, producer, associate producer, mixing
 Larry Saltzman – electric guitar

References

External links
 

1989 albums
David Van Tieghem albums
Private Music albums